Grand Forks Secondary School is a public high school in Grand Forks, British Columbia part of School District 51 Boundary. Grand Forks Secondary School, abbreviated GFSS, has two principals, Head Principal Brian Foy and Vice Principal Jon Dowswell. It has many sports teams including rugby, basketball, curling, and volleyball.

High schools in British Columbia
Boundary Country
Educational institutions in Canada with year of establishment missing